Wande is a town in  Changqing District, in the southern reaches of Jinan City, Shandong, China, located along G3 Beijing–Taipei Expressway. , it has one residential communities and 75 villages under its administration.

References

Township-level divisions of Shandong